Paraegocidnus feai is a species of beetle in the family Cerambycidae, and the only species in the genus Paraegocidnus. It was described by Breuning in 1956.

References

Acanthocinini
Beetles described in 1956
Monotypic beetle genera